Home and Away is an Australian television series.

Home and Away may also refer to:
Home and Away (film), a 1956 British film starring Jack Warner
"Home and Away", a song by Humble Pie from  the 1969 album Town and Country
Home and Away (1972 TV series), a British television series
"Home and Away" (song), a 1987 song written for the Australian television series and later released as a single
Home and Away, a 1994 novel by Joanne Meschery
Home and Away (album), a 2006 album by Del Shannon
Home and away season, the regular season of a sporting competition, where teams play games both at home and away venues
Home and Away (newspaper), a weekly Irish emigrant newspaper in New York City
Home and Away (comic strip)